Stenotus armerioides, the thrift mock goldenweed, is a perennial plant in the family Asteraceae.

The plant is native to areas of the Western United States and to Saskatchewan, Canada. It is found in the Colorado Plateau and Canyonlands region.

References

External links
 USDA Plants Profile for Stenotus armerioides (thrift mock goldenweed)

Astereae
Flora of the Western United States
Flora of the Colorado Plateau and Canyonlands region
Flora of Saskatchewan
Flora without expected TNC conservation status